Democracy movements of China are a series of organized political movements, inside and outside of China, addressing a variety of grievances, including objections to socialist bureaucratism and objections to the continuation of the one-party rule of the Chinese Communist Party (CCP) itself. The Democracy Wall movement of November 1978 to spring 1981 is typically regarded as the beginning of contemporary Chinese democracy movement.  In addition to the Democracy Wall movement, the events of the 1989 Tiananmen Square protests and massacre are among the notable examples of Chinese democracy movements.

History

The beginning of China's democracy movements is usually regarded as the Democracy Wall movement of November 1978 to spring 1981. The Democracy Wall movement framed the key issue as the elimination of bureaucratism and the bureaucratic class. Former Red Guards from both rebel and conservative factions were the core of the movement. Democracy Wall participants agreed that "democracy" was the means to resolve the conflict between the bureaucratic class and the people, the nature of the proposed democratic institutions was a major source of disagreement. A majority of participants in the movement favored viewed the movement as part of a struggle between correct and incorrect notions of Marxism. Many participants advocated classical Marxist views that drew on the Paris Commune for inspiration. The Democracy Wall movement also included non-Marxists and anti-Marxists, although these participants were a minority. Demands for "democracy" were frequent but without an agreed-upon meaning. Participants in the movement variously associated the concept of democracy with socialism, communism, liberal democracy, capitalism, and Christianity. They drew on a diverse range of intellectual resources "ranging from classical Marxist and socialist traditions to Enlightenment philosophers, [socialist] experiments in Yugoslavia, and Western liberal democracy." 

Significant documents of the Democracy Wall Movement include The Fifth Modernization manifesto by Wei Jingsheng, who was sentenced to fifteen years in prison for authoring the document. In it, Wei argued that political liberalization and the empowerment of the laboring masses was essential for modernization, that the CCP was controlled by reactionaries and that the people must struggle to overthrow the reactionaries via a long and possibly bloody fight.

Throughout the 1980s, these ideas increased in popularity among college-educated Chinese. In response to growing corruption, economic dislocation and the sense that reforms in the Soviet Union and Eastern Europe were leaving China behind, the Tiananmen Square protests erupted in 1989. These protests were violently suppressed by government troops on June 4, 1989. In response, a number of pro-democracy organizations were formed by overseas Chinese student activists, and there was considerable sympathy for the movement among Westerners, who formed the China Support Network (CSN).

Government's response
Ideologically, the government's first reaction to the democracy movement was an effort to focus on the personal behavior of individual dissidents and argue that they were tools of foreign powers. In the mid-1990s, the government began using more effective arguments which were influenced by Chinese Neo-Conservatism and Western authors such as Edmund Burke. The main argument was that China's main priority was economic growth, and economic growth required political stability. The democracy movement was flawed because it promoted radicalism and revolution which put the gains that China had made into jeopardy. In contrast to Wei's argument that democracy was essential to economic growth, the government argued that economic growth must come before political liberalization, comparable to what happened in the Four Asian Tigers.

With regard to political dissent engendered by the movement, the government has taken a three-pronged approach. First, dissidents who are widely known in the West such as Wei Jingsheng, Fang Lizhi, and Wang Dan are deported. Although Chinese criminal law does not contain any provisions for exiling citizens, these deportations are conducted by giving the dissident a severe jail sentence and then granting medical parole. Second, the less well-known leaders of a dissident movement are identified and given severe jail sentences. Generally, the government targets a relatively small number of organizers who are crucial in coordinating a movement and who are then charged with endangering state security or revealing official secrets. Thirdly, the government attempts to address the grievances of possible supporters of the movement. This is intended to isolate the leadership of the movement, and prevent disconnected protests from combining into a general organized protest that can threaten the Communist hold on power.

Chinese socialist democracy
CCP leaders assert there are already elements of democracy; they dubbed the term "Chinese socialist democracy" for what they describe as a participatory representative government.

Academic interpretations 
Academic Lin Chun criticizes the phrase "democracy movement" as typically used in the scholarly and media discourse on China, noting that the term is often used exclusively to refer to the "demands and activism of an urban, educated group of people seeking liberal more than democratic values." She notes, for example, that the political turbulence in universities over the period 1986 to 1989 had specific flash points ranging from anger at the government's "too soft" position on China–Japan relations to poor management of student welfare.

See also 
Protest and dissent in China
2011 Chinese pro-democracy protests
Liberalism in China

References

 
Political movements
Political repression in China
Democracy movements by country